Power Drive or Power Drives may refer to:

Manufacturers 
 Universal Power Drives, a British truck and car manufacturer

Motors 
 Yuneec Power Drive 10, a Chinese electric aircraft motor
 Yuneec Power Drive 20, a Chinese electric aircraft motor
 Yuneec Power Drive 40, a Chinese electric aircraft motor
 Yuneec Power Drive 60, a Chinese electric aircraft motor

Music 
 Power Drive, composed by Johnny Pearson

Video games 
 Power Drive (1987 video game), an arcade racing game from 1987 by Bally Midway
 Power Drive (1994 video game), a racing game from 1994 by Rage Software Ltd.